The 1971–72 FIBA Women's European Champions Cup was the twelfth edition of FIBA Europe's competition for women's basketball national champion clubs, running from October 1971 to April 1972. The group stage was expanded from six to eight teams.

Daugava Riga defeated Sparta Prague in the final to win their ninth title in a row.

Qualification round

Round of 14

Group stage

Group A

Group B

Semifinals

Finals

References

Champions Cup
EuroLeague Women seasons